Yuri Zhukov may refer to:

 Yuri Zhukov (journalist) (1908–1991), journalist and political figure in the Soviet Union
 Yuri Zhukov (historian) (born 1938), Russian historian
 Yuri Zhukov (dancer) (born 1964), Russian ballet dancer